Eliseo Antonio Ariotti (born 17 November 1948) is an Italian prelate of the Catholic Church who works in the diplomatic service of the Holy See. He has been Apostolic Nuncio to Paraguay since 2009.

Biography
Eliseo Antonio Ariotti was born on 17 November 1948 in Vailate, Province of Cremona, Italy. He was ordained a priest of the Diocese of Cremona on 7 May 1975. He entered the Vatican’s diplomatic service on 10 May 1984 and served in Uganda, Syria, Malta, the United States, and in Rome in the offices of the Secretariat of State, followed by an assignment in Spain and three years in France.

On 17 July 2003, Pope John Paul II appointed him Titular Archbishop of Vibiana and Apostolic Nuncio to Cameroon. On 5 August 2003, John Paul named him Apostolic Nuncio to Equatorial Guinea as well. He received his episcopal consecration from Cardinal Angelo Sodano on 5 October on the Cathedral of Cremona.

On 5 November 2009, Pope Benedict XVI appointed him Apostolic Nuncio to Paraguay.

See also
 List of heads of the diplomatic missions of the Holy See

References

External links 
 Catholic Hierarchy: Archbishop Eliseo Antonio Ariotti 

Clergy from the Province of Cremona
Apostolic Nuncios to Paraguay
Apostolic Nuncios to Equatorial Guinea
Apostolic Nuncios to Cameroon
1948 births
Living people